The Hashemite Arab Federation was a short-lived country that was formed in 1958 from the union between the Hashemite Kingdoms of Iraq and Jordan. Although the name implies a federal structure, it was de facto a confederation.

The Federation was formed on 14 February 1958, when King Faisal II of Iraq and his cousin, King Hussein of Jordan, sought to unite their two Hashemite kingdoms, as a response to the formation of the United Arab Republic between Egypt and Syria. The union lasted only six months, being officially dissolved on 2 August 1958, after Faisal was deposed by a military coup on 14 July.

Background

From the 1930s on the Hashemite dynasty tried to promote Arab unity, as witnessed by the efforts of Iraq and Jordan to unite at three different times. "From the Iraqi perspective, Jordan had little to offer, either economically or strategically, to counterbalance its numerous liabilities". The liabilities included Jordanian King Abdullah's moderation on the Arab–Israeli conflict, his installation by United Kingdom and the unstable relationship between Abdullah and his nephew, Iraqi regent, 'Abd al-Ilah. Regardless of the issues, the two countries first attempted unification in 1946 and 1947 and was introduced by King Abdallah "Stemming from his renewed promotion of the Greater Syria Scheme". The second time was in 1951 and 1952 and resulted from the attempt to rescue Jordan and the Hashemite control after Abdullah was assassinated.

In 1958 was the third alliance, which came out of the shared regional interests between Iraq and Jordan against the expansion of the United Arab Republic.

During the post-colonial years in the Arab world many forces argued for the creation of a single Arab state. Popular under the name of Arab nationalism, it became increasingly popular among young intellectuals throughout the Middle East and in Iraq during the 1950s. Many different versions of Arab nationalism arose, which developed into an Arab Cold War. The movements were led by many different leaders, the most famous being that espoused by Gamal Abdel Nasser, the president of Egypt. His vision of a pan-Arab state was one that was free of foreign and specifically European interference, with land reform, socialist sympathies and dissolution of the ruling monarchies. For royalist and pro-European Iraq and Jordan, Nasser's vision was incompatible with their existence. Led by Prime Minister Nuri al-Said under King Faisal II, Iraq and Jordan were Hashemite monarchies since their establishment in 1922 at the bequest of the British. The basis of rule in Iraq was diametrically opposite to the type of rule espoused by Nasser, who had overthrown Egypt's own monarchy in 1952, when the Free Officers Movement forced King Farouk into exile.

Further complicating the relationship with pan-Arabism was Iraq's relationship with the West and its Anti-Soviet containment policy. In 1955, Iraq entered the short-lived Baghdad Pact at the urging of the United Kingdom and the United States. The pact sought to block the Soviet Union from southward expansion by preventing it from getting access to the petroleum resources of the Middle East and aimed to prevent it from establishing a foothold in the region, especially among the populace. It aligned Iraq with Turkey, Pakistan, Iran and the United Kingdom.

While al-Said vainly saw the treaty as a "guarantee" to the security of the Iraqi state, his government and the Hashemite monarchy, Nasser openly and loudly criticised the treaty as a capitulation to imperialist traitors.

In early 1958, the formation the United Arab Republic (UAR) between Syria and Egypt brought Nasser's pan-Arab ideals that threatened the existence of both Hashemite regimes, to the Western borders of Iraq. To counter Nasser's pan-Arabism, as-Said approached the Hashemite government of Jordan to discuss the formation of a union while also appeasing Arab nationalists within Iraq. Officially formed on 14 February 1958, the Arab Union or Arab Federation united foreign policy and defense of each country but left the vast majority of other domestic programs under national jurisdiction. According to the 7th article of the Federation convention, the Arab revolt flag came to be the official flag of the Union.

Nuri as-Said became the Premier of the Arab Union, mistakenly believing that the Iraqi military command would keep the King on his throne and his government in power, but he neglected to see the growing opposition in the Sunni officer corps against the regime. That overthrew him and Iraqi government and ended the Arab Union in the summer of 1958.

Iraqi military coup

Tension between the UAR and the Arab Union (Arab Federation) resulted in the fall of as-Said, the Union and the entire Iraqi Hashemite regime.  During the summer of 1958, UAR troop movements to the Syrian border instigated the Arab Union to mobilize troops to counter this move.  In July 1958, troops led by Abd al-Karim Qasim travelling through Iraq, took a chance to overthrow the King and his government in Baghdad. With the fall and resulting deaths of Saed, King Faisal II and the rest of the Iraqi royal family, both the Hashemite regime fell and with it the short-lived Arab Union.

The deposition of the Hashemites in Iraq had immediate ramifications on the Hashemites in Jordan. Not only were King Hussein's ruling cousins in Iraq executed for their attempted oppression, but so was the Jordanian Prime Minister Ibrahim Hashem who was visiting at the time. After the revolutionaries in Iraq declared a republic, King Hussein of Jordan requested "immediate British and U.S. help to maintain his throne." The British sent 4,000 soldiers to Jordan who remained until November 2, 1958 while the US stationed troops in Beirut. The British forces remained until November 2, 1958 when the US pledged to "support the throne [of the Hashemites in Jordan]" and "provide the country with $40 to $50 million as an annual subsidy, replacing the British subsidy".

Yet, however, the revolution and downfall of the Hashemite dynasty in Iraq would not be the end of relations between Iraq and Jordan. In 1975, Jordan turned away from their economic relationship with Syria and instead looked to Iraq. Iraq offered Jordan a strong economy, oil money, a large market and strategic depth. With Iraq's financial aid, Jordan made some economic gains. In fact, by 1990 Iraq was "Jordan's largest market, it was repaying trade credit debts in oil, and it held out the hope of lucrative reconstruction contracts after the Iran–Iraq War."

See also
Iraq–Jordan relations
Pan-Arabism
United Arab Republic
United Arab Emirates

References

1950s in Iraq
1950s in Jordan
Arab nationalism in Iraq
Arab nationalism in Jordan
Former Arab states
Former confederations
History of the Middle East
Iraq–Jordan relations
Federation
Politics of Iraq
Politics of Jordan
Political organisations based in Jordan
States and territories disestablished in 1958
States and territories established in 1958